Puget Sound Gunners FC was an American soccer team based in Issaquah, Washington, United States. Founded in 2010, the team played in the Premier Development League (PDL), the fourth tier of the American Soccer Pyramid, from 2011 to 2015.

In 2012, the team played its home games at Edmonds Stadium, but moved to Issaquah High School Stadium for the 2014 season. The team's colors were light blue and white.

History
North Sound SeaWolves was announced as a USL Premier Development League expansion franchise on November 29, 2010. The team is, essentially, a replacement for the Yakima Reds franchise, which folded at the end of the 2010 season after over a decade in the league, and which was also owned by SeaWolves owner Alex Silva.

The team announced on February 23, 2011, that they had signed former English Premier League player Adam Nowland as player-coach for the SeaWolves' inaugural season. Nowland will serve as assistant coach to head coach Alex Silva as well as be a field player for the squad.

The club signed long-time Seattle Sounders (USL) player Craig Tomlinson on 18 March 2011.

The SeaWolves played their first competitive game on May 7, 2011, a 0–0 tie with the Washington Crossfire.

On January 16, 2013, the club rebranded as Puget Sound Gunners FC after partnering with the Issaquah Soccer Club.

On January 29, 2016, the Gunners PDL franchise rights were sold to the Victoria Highlanders so they could rejoin the PDL.

Players

Current roster
Current

''Roster as of 2015:

Year-by-year

Click on year for team's season wiki.

Head coaches
  Alex Silva (2011–present)

Stadium
 Goddard Memorial Stadium; Everett, Washington (2011)
 Edmonds Stadium; Edmonds, Washington (2012–2013)
 Issaquah High School; Issaquah, Washington (2014–Current)

Average attendance
Attendance stats are calculated by averaging each team's self-reported home attendances from the historical match archive at https://web.archive.org/web/20131208011525/http://www.uslsoccer.com/history/index_E.html and http://www.kenn.com/the_blog/?p=6037

 2011: 182
 2012: 135
 2013: 234
 2014: 133

References

External links
 Official site
 Official PDL site

Association football clubs established in 2010
Soccer clubs in Washington (state)
Sports in Everett, Washington
2010 establishments in Washington (state)
2015 disestablishments in Washington (state)
Association football clubs disestablished in 2015
Defunct Premier Development League teams
Organizations based in Issaquah, Washington